KJYR (104.5 MHz) is a non-profit FM radio station licensed to Newport, Washington, and serving the Spokane metropolitan area. The station is owned by the Growing Christian Foundation, and broadcasts a Christian adult contemporary radio format.

KJYR has an effective radiated power (ERP) of 87,000 watts. Its transmitter is on Moon Hill in Cusick, Washington, near the Pend Oreille River. Because its tower is about 50 miles north of Spokane, KJYR also has booster stations in Spokane, Chewelah, Colville and Sand Point, Idaho. They all operate on 104.5 MHz.

History

Launch
Originally assigned KMJY-FM in 1989 and receiving its broadcast license in 1990, this station was assigned the KQQB-FM call sign by the Federal Communications Commission on December 21, 2005.

KQQB-FM was one of two Rhythmic Contemporary outlets serving the Spokane area when it signed on in December 2005 (KEZE was the other). In December 2006, they re-imaged themselves as "Live 104.5" and shifted away from their Rhythmic lean for a somewhat more mainstream direction. In June 2008, the station fell silent for nearly a full year.

On June 5, 2008, the on-line website All Access reported that KQQB-FM and KAZZ were taken off the air. No reason was given for the abrupt sign-off, but whatever issue took the stations dark was "in court," although there were no details as to what those issues weare. According to messages posted at Radio-Info.com, there were issues detailing the sale of both stations that resulted in former owners Radio Station KMJY, LLC going to court to regain control after Proactive Communications defaulted on paying the final $1 million of a $6 million deal. Radio Station KMJY, LLC then obtained a court order to seize the equipment from the studio and the station tower.

According to the FCC database, the station went silent on June 4, 2008, and on June 16, 2008, applied for special temporary authority to "remain silent", which was granted on August 27, 2008. The reason given in the application was "A secured creditor has seized transmitting equipment necessary to the operation of the station." This special temporary authority was scheduled to expire on February 24, 2009. The FCC accepted an application for an extension of this stay-silent authority on February 2, 2009. Per the FCC notification, the broadcast license of KQQB-FM would have automatically expired as a matter of law if broadcast operations did not resume by 12:01 a.m. on June 5, 2009.

Service restored
In a June 2009 filing with the FCC, KQQB-FM said that it resumed broadcasting shortly before the deadline but that it began "experiencing program delivery problems" and fell silent again on June 3, 2009. The licensee attested that it was working on an alternative method of program delivery so that it may "return the station to broadcast service". The FCC accepted this new application for authorization to remain silent but, as of July 23, 2009, had taken no further action.

In September 2009, the station returned to the air with a rhythmic contemporary music format branded as "Cube 104.5".

104.5 Jamz KGZG-FM
Pendleton Broadcasting announced they would enter under a lease management and purchase agreement with KMJY, LLC in May 2010 and relaunched KQQB-FM's Rhythmic CHR format as "104.5 JAMZ" on June 1, 2010. The station's call sign changed to KGZG-FM on June 16, 2010. The station was noted for having a wide variety of Hits & Hip Hop music, including breaking new music that other Rhythmic stations in the country wouldn't play, as well as having no on-air personalities or syndicated shows.

On April 1, 2014, KGZG-FM's four-year LMA agreement ended and was not renewed by Pendleton Broadcasting. KMJY then took the station silent while waiting for a new purchase offer and new ownership. Pendleton has since moved the station's format to the internet as an online radio station.

104.5 Hank-FM

On December 11, 2014, KGZG-FM returned to the air under new LMA with Alexandra Communications, as they launched a classic country format as "104.5 Hank FM." The launch also gave Spokane its fourth country outlet. On December 1, 2014, KGZG-FM changed its call sign to KNHK-FM.

All Christmas 104.5 FM
After Hank FM was bought by Xana Oregon, LLC in July 2021, Hank FM switched to All Christmas 104.5 FM on October 1, 2021. With the change of music format, KNHK-FM switched its call sign to KZIU-FM on October 12, while KZIU-FM switched to KNHK-FM for Hank FM in Walla Walla.

Joy 104.5 FM
After All Christmas 104.5, on January 1, 2022, at 12:00 AM on New Years, KZIU-FM switched to start playing Christian adult contemporary music. As of that point, they kept the KZIU-FM call sign as well the website allchristmas1045.com. By the time radio news website RadioInsight reported on the change (coming with such little announcement that they didn't do so until almost three weeks after, on the 19th), the station began identifying as KJYR, although as of the RadioInsight report they had yet to file the change with the FCC, which still identified them as KZIU-FM. On April 6, 2022, the call sign was formally changed to KJYR.

Ownership
In July 2005, Radio Station KMJY, LLC, reached an agreement to sell this station to Proactive Communications, Inc. The deal was approved by the FCC on September 1, 2005, and the transaction was consummated on September 28, 2005.

Proactive Communications, the station's licensee at the time this station went silent, also owned and operated 1970s Oldies-formatted KAZZ, which was in the same studio in downtown Spokane.

In July 2008, Proactive Communications, Inc., reached an agreement to return the broadcast license for this station to Radio Station KMJY, LLC. The deal was approved by the FCC on September 10, 2008, and the transaction was consummated on the same day.

Effective July 16, 2021, Legend Broadcasting sold KNHK-FM, KYOZ, and translator K239CL to Tom Hodgins and Christopher Jacky's Xana Oregon, LLC for $395,000.

FM boosters
KJYR programming is also carried on broadcast translator or booster stations to extend or improve the coverage area of the station.

References

External links

JYR
Radio stations established in 1990
Pend Oreille County, Washington
1990 establishments in Washington (state)
Contemporary Christian radio stations in the United States
Religious radio stations in the United States